Høyland Church is a parish church of the Church of Norway in the large Sandnes municipality in Rogaland county, Norway. It is located in the borough of Austrått in the city of Sandnes in the far western part of the municipality. It is one of the two churches for the Høyland parish which is part of the Sandnes prosti (deanery) in the Diocese of Stavanger. The white, wooden church was built in a long church design in 1841 using designs by the architect Hans Linstow. The church seats about 650 people.

History
The earliest existing historical records of the church date back to the year 1298, but the church was not new that year. The church was originally called Gond Church and it may have been a stave church. The old church was torn down in 1663 and a new timber-framed church was constructed in 1664. Many of the materials from the old church were recycled and reused in the construction of the new church.

In 1814, this church served as an election church. Together with more than 300 other parish churches across Norway, it was a polling station for elections to the 1814 Norwegian Constituent Assembly which wrote the Constitution of Norway. This was Norway's first national elections. Each church parish was a constituency that elected people called "electors" who later met together in each county to elect the representatives for the assembly that was to meet in Eidsvoll later that year.

After that church was completed, the old church was torn down. The new church was consecrated on 22 August 1841. In the early 21st century, the church cemetery was extended to the west towards the old church site. The river now passes directly by the old church site.

Media gallery

See also
List of churches in Rogaland

References

Sandnes
Churches in Rogaland
Wooden churches in Norway
19th-century Church of Norway church buildings
Churches completed in 1841
13th-century establishments in Norway
Norwegian election church